The women's 3000 metres at the 2021 World Athletics U20 Championships was held at the Kasarani Stadium on 19 August.

Records

Results
The final was held on 19 August at 17:40.

References

3000 metres women
Long distance running at the World Athletics U20 Championships
U20